Roberto Andrés Marinangeli (born 24 April 1981) is an Argentine football manager and former player who played as a goalkeeper.

Playing career
Born in Pérez, Santa Fe, Marinangeli began his career with Renato Cesarini, and played for the reserve side of Rosario Central before moving to Chile with Deportes La Serena in 2000.

Back to his home country in 2002, Marinangeli played for Banco Nación, Totoras Juniors, Gödeken and Arroyo Seco before moving to Spain in 2010, with EMF Aluche.

Managerial career
While playing for Aluche, Marinangeli was a goalkeeping coach of the youth sides and also acted an assistant manager of the first team. In 2012, he joined Esteban Becker's staff at the Equatorial Guinea women's football team.

In 2017, Marinangeli was recruited by Guangzhou Evergrande to work in their football schools in Madrid, and also returned to Aluche in January 2018, now named first team manager. In the 2019–20 season, he was a part of Lolo Escobar's coaching staff at Las Rozas CF, working as a goalkeeping coach.

In August 2020, after a short period in charge of lowly Madrilenian side Iglesia La Vid FC, Marinangeli moved to the United Arab Emirates to work as the under-18 manager of Dibba Al-Hisn SC. He switched teams and countries again in July 2021, after being named David Perdiguero's assistant at Bolivian club Real Santa Cruz.

Marinangeli left the Bolivian side in December 2021, being named manager of Altos Hornos Zapla in his home country shortly after. On 16 March 2022, he returned to Real Santa Cruz, now being appointed first team manager in the place of sacked Daniel Farrar.

On his managerial debut for the Albos on 2 April 2022, Marinangeli's side defeated Oriente Petrolero by 2–1. On 21 November, he left Santa Cruz.

On 5 January 2023, Marinangeli remained in Bolivia after being named in charge of Jorge Wilstermann. Eighteen days later, however, a new board of the club presented Christian Díaz as manager, and he was dismissed; on 17 February, he remained in the country after taking over top tier newcomers Libertad Gran Mamoré, but was sacked less than a month later.

Personal life
Marinangeli's brother Sergio is also a football manager. Both worked together at Iglesia La Vid.

References

External links

1981 births
Living people
Sportspeople from Santa Fe Province
Argentine footballers
Rosario Central footballers
Divisiones Regionales de Fútbol players
Argentine expatriate footballers
Expatriate footballers in Spain
Argentine expatriate sportspeople in Spain
Argentine football managers
Bolivian Primera División managers
Real Santa Cruz managers
C.D. Jorge Wilstermann managers
Libertad Gran Mamoré F.C. managers
Argentine expatriate football managers
Argentine expatriates in Equatorial Guinea
Argentine expatriate sportspeople in China
Argentine expatriate sportspeople in the United Arab Emirates
Argentine expatriate sportspeople in Bolivia
Expatriate football managers in Bolivia
Argentine people of Italian descent